Pink slime is a meat by-product.

Pink slime may also refer to:
 Pink-slime journalism, a practice in news media
 Pink Slime, an EP by Mac Miller

See also 
 Slime (disambiguation)
 Pink algae